mir-395 is a non-coding RNA called a microRNA that was identified in both Arabidopsis thaliana and Oryza sativa computationally and was later experimentally verified. mir-395 is thought to target mRNAs coding for ATP sulphurylases. The mature sequence is excised from the 3' arm of the hairpin.

miR-395 is upregulated in Arabidopsis during sulphate-limited conditions, when the mature miRNA then regulates sulphur transporters and ATP sulphurylases.

References

External links 
 
 miRBase family entry for mir-395

MicroRNA
MicroRNA precursor families